Tribe Magazine was a free print magazine originally distributed in Toronto, Ontario as well as across Canada from 1993 to 2005. The magazine featured photography, music, CD reviews, and dance and club listings.  It currently has an online presence as an internet message board and social network which provides all the functions of the print version.

Magazine
Tribe Magazines beginnings coincided with Toronto's fledgling club scene.  The name was coined after publisher alexd observed "tribes" of club kids roaming the streets of the city looking for warehouse parties after the normal bars closed.

In 2004, the magazine boasted a circulation of 100,000 readers a month. It published 109 issues and is currently on hiatus.

TRIBE is published by Tribe Communications Inc., a privately held Canadian company. The word "TRIBE" was registered as a trademark in 2003 for use by Tribe Communications Inc. for on-line, print publishing and online advertising. The trademark is owned by Alex Dordevic, the CEO of TRIBE Communications Inc., and is used by the company under license.

TRIBE printed edition: 
Online edition:

Social network
TRIBE was the first Canadian magazine to go on-line in the country. Launched in 1994 as the digital version of Tribe Magazine, TRIBE is an on-line magazine existing as a large, active, online community and social network aimed at 18 to 50-year-olds, with an overall focus on urban living in Canada. TRIBE has been on-line continuously since 1994.

The site contains separate sub-forums, referred to as "rooms" by the TRIBE community, that cover a wide variety of topics including  new music, technology, nightlife, culture, sports, men's and women's issues, and politics. The site contains over 4.5 million individual message posts, making it one of the largest online communities on the Internet (Big Boards).

The DJ Mixes area contains the most extensive collection of links to mixes by Canadian DJs in Canada. This area was developed to allow Canadian DJs to showcase their skills, hopefully leading to paying gigs at nightclubs and events.

See also
 Electronic music

References

External links
 Tribe Magazine website

1993 establishments in Ontario
2005 disestablishments in Ontario
Defunct magazines published in Canada
Entertainment magazines published in Canada
Free magazines
Independent magazines
Magazines established in 1993
Magazines disestablished in 2005
Magazines published in Toronto
Online publishing companies of Canada